Miller's Anatomy of the Dog is a veterinary textbook which was first published in 1964. It deals with the structure, organs and tissues of the dog. The fifth edition was published in 2020.

Malcolm E. Miller began work on the first edition of the textbook in 1946, having completed a thesis in 1940 entitled "The Dissection and Study of the Trunk of the Dog". Miller based each description and illustration in the book on at least five canine dissections. Miller died in 1960, and the first edition of The Anatomy of the Dog was published posthumously in 1964, with George C. Christensen and Howard E. Evans as co-authors. Evans and Christensen also co-authored the second edition, published in 1979, retitled as Miller's Anatomy of the Dog. This edition was translated into Japanese, and was described by the Canadian Veterinary Journal as being "...more than a manual. It will probably be regarded as a kind of Bible in its own field..."

Evans was the sole author of the third edition, which was published in 1993. The third edition was reviewed in the Journal of the American Veterinary Medical Association, and the Journal of Small Animal Practice.

The fourth edition, published in 2012, was the first in full color. It had fewer pages than the third edition, due to a reduction in text and image size. Reviewers from the Canadian Veterinary Journal and the Journal of the American Veterinary Medical Association found this did not detract from the clarity of the information presented. The fourth edition was reviewed by several other specialty veterinary journals, including The Veterinary Journal, the Journal of Small Animal Practice, and the Australian Veterinary Journal. The fourth edition was noted by a specialist cat publication, the Journal of Feline Medicine and Surgery, to be a "solid and well-referenced work" despite its "deficiency" of lacking information about cats. This edition was revised by Evans, and co-authored by Alexander de Lahunta.

The fifth edition was published in 2020, and was described in a review in the Journal of the American Veterinary Medical Association as remaining "the most comprehensive textbook on the anatomy of the canine body." This edition was edited by de Lahunta, in conjunction with John W. Hermanson.

Editions

References

Further reading
 

Veterinary medicine books
English-language books
Books about dogs
Anatomy books
Books published posthumously
1964 non-fiction books
Biology textbooks